Group C of the 2013 Africa Cup of Nations ran from 21 January until 29 January. It consisted of Zambia (holders), Nigeria, Burkina Faso and Ethiopia. The matches were held in the South African cities of Nelspruit and Rustenburg.

Standings

All times South African Standard Time (UTC+2)

Zambia vs. Ethiopia

Nigeria vs. Burkina Faso

Zambia vs. Nigeria

Burkina Faso vs. Ethiopia

Burkina Faso vs. Zambia

Ethiopia vs. Nigeria

References

External links

2013 Africa Cup of Nations